John Cowley may refer to:
 John Cowley (actor) (1923–1998), Irish actor
 John Cowley (British Army officer) (1905–1993), British Army general
 John Cowley (cartographer), 18th-century mathematician and Royal mapmaker to King George II of Great Britain
 John Cowley (cricketer) (1885–1957), English cricketer
 John Cowley (entomologist) (1909–1967), English entomologist
 John Cowley (racing driver), racing driver who competed at the Bathurst 12 Hour
 John Duncan Cowley (1897–1944), librarian and author
 John Lodge Cowley (1719–1787), English cartographer, geologist and mathematician
 John M. Cowley (1923–2004), professor at Arizona State University

See also
 Jack Cowley (1877–1926), English footballer